Alexandre Stassievitch (born 20 September 1950) is a French former professional footballer who played as a defender. He played club football for Lens, Poissy, Montluçon, Nœux-les-Mines, and Saint-Omer, and represented France at the 1976 Summer Olympics.

Club career
Born in Libercourt, Stassievitch began playing football as a center forward for local side Ostricourt. In 1972, he signed for RC Lens and began playing as a defender for the second team. He made his Ligue 1 debut for Lens in 1974, making several more appearances during his time with the club. He was on the bench as Lens lost the Coupe de France 1974-75 final.

Stassievitch spent the following seasons in Ligue 2, one with AS Poissy and two with ÉDS Montluçon. In 1980, Gérard Houllier recruited him for US Nœux-les-Mines. In his two seasons with the club, they entered the promotion playoffs and reached the 1/16-finals of the Coupe de France.

He would spend the next five years playing amateur football for US Saint-Omer before retiring in 1987.

International career
Stassievitch captained France at the 1976 Summer Olympics in Montreal, where the team reached the quarterfinals.

References

External links

Biography at Sports-reference.com
Profile at Afterfoot.fr

1950 births
Living people
French footballers
Footballers at the 1976 Summer Olympics
Olympic footballers of France
RC Lens players
AS Poissy players
Montluçon Football players
Ligue 1 players
Ligue 2 players
Association football defenders
Mediterranean Games silver medalists for France
Mediterranean Games medalists in football
Competitors at the 1975 Mediterranean Games
US Saint-Omer players
US Nœux-les-Mines players